Terri is a 2011 American comedy-drama film directed by Azazel Jacobs and starring Jacob Wysocki, Creed Bratton, and John C. Reilly. The film is about the friendship that develops between an oversized teen misfit and the garrulous but well-meaning school principal who takes an interest in him. Filming took place in Los Angeles, California.

Premise
Overweight and depressed 15-year-old Terri Thompson starts to slack off in school and wear pajamas, to the chagrin of his teachers. Soon Terri is taken under the wing of unconventional assistant principal Mr. Fitzgerald, who creates a series of Monday-morning counseling sessions for social outcasts at the school.

Cast
 Jacob Wysocki as Terri Thompson, a shy, bullied, overweight teenager
 Creed Bratton as Uncle James, Terri's sick uncle for whom he is sole caregiver
 John C. Reilly as Darryl Fitzgerald, an unconventional but understanding assistant principal who takes Terri under his wing
 Bridger Zadina as Chad Markson, a mentally unstable student at Terri's school
 Olivia Crocicchia as Heather Miles, an outcast girl who may or may not have been the willing victim of a sexual act
 Melanie Abramoff as Amy
 Tara Karsian as Mrs. Davidson, Terri's homeroom teacher
 Tim Heidecker as Mr. Flemisch, the gym teacher
 Mary Anne McGarry as Mrs. Hamish, the office receptionist
 Jenna Gavigan as Samantha Goode, the office receptionist
 Justin Prentice as Dirty Zach
 Eddie Pepitone as Joe Hollywood
 Nelson Mashita as Robert, the custodian
 Josh Perry as Marcus Bloom

Reception

Box office
The film was released in January 2011 at the 2011 Sundance Film Festival, and later at the Florida, San Francisco, and Boston film festivals.
Terri opened in the United States in limited release on July 1, 2011 and achieved the second highest per location average for the holiday weekend (second only to Transformers: Dark of the Moon).

Critical response
Rotten Tomatoes gives the film a score of 87%, with an average rating of 7.1 out of 10, based on 98 reviews from critics. The website's "Critics Consensus" for the film reads, "Embodied with compelling sensitivity by newcomer Jacob Wysocki and supported by a wonderful John C. Reilly, Terri is an emotionally powerful character study."

A.O. Scott of the New York Times said, "What lifts Terri above its peers is not the plight of its protagonist or the film's sympathy for him, but rather the care and craft that the director, Azazel Jacobs, has brought to fairly conventional material" and Betsy Sharkey of the Los Angeles Times called it, "...impossible not to love". Roger Ebert gave the film 4 stars out of 4.

References

External links
 
 

2011 films
2010s coming-of-age comedy-drama films
2010s teen comedy-drama films
American coming-of-age comedy-drama films
American teen comedy-drama films
Films shot in Los Angeles
American independent films
Films with screenplays by Patrick deWitt
2011 independent films
2010s English-language films
2010s American films